The wax acids are a subgroup of saturated unbranched alkanoic acids. The frontier between fatty acids and wax acids is fluid. It often begins at 22 carbon atoms.

The members are:
 Behenic acid C-22
 Lignoceric acid C-24
 Cerotic acid C-26
 Montanic acid C-28
 Melissic acid C-30
 Lacceroic acid C-32
 Geddic acid C-34

Alkanoic acids